The 1941 Creighton Bluejays football team was an American football team that represented Creighton University as a member of the Missouri Valley Conference (MVC) during the 1941 college football season. In its second season under head coach Maurice H. Palrang, the team compiled a 5–5 record (3–1 against MVC opponents) and was outscored by a total of 160 to 115. The team played its home games at Creighton Stadium in Omaha, Nebraska.

Four Creighton players were selected by the conference coaches as second-team players on the 1941 All-Missouri Valley Conference football team: halfback Tony Porto; end Joe Boyle; center Fred Dondelinger; and tackle John Powers.

Schedule

References

Creighton
Creighton Bluejays football seasons
Creighton Bluejays football